Fatehgarh Churian Assembly constituency (Sl. No.: 9) is a Punjab Legislative Assembly constituency in Gurdaspur district, Punjab state, India.

Member of Legislative Assembly
 2012: Tripat Rajinder Singh Bajwa, Indian National Congress

Election results

2022

2017

References

External links
  

Assembly constituencies of Punjab, India
Gurdaspur district